Hajer Football Club (Arabic: نادي هجر) is a professional association football club based in Al-Hasa, Saudi Arabia. The team play in the  Saudi First Division League, also known as the Yelo League due to sponsorship reasons, is the second tier of Saudi Arabian football.

Established in 1950, the club is the oldest team in Al-Hasa region. The club have been promoted to the top tier of Saudi Football on 4 different occasions. Hajer have a record equal 4 First Division titles and have won the Prince Faisal bin Fahd cup once.

The club share their home stadium, Prince Abdullah bin Jalawi Stadium, with city rivals Al-Fateh with whom they contest the Ahsa derby with.

History
Hajer Club were founded in the city of Hofuf part of the Al-Ahsa province in 1948 and they are the oldest professional football club in the Al-Ahsa region. The club was officially recognized as a professional football club in the year of 1950. The club was formerly called "Al-Badr" before changing their name to "Hajer".

In the 2010–11 season Hajer finished first in the Saudi First Division and were promoted to the Saudi Professional League for the first time since 1998.

Honours

Prince Faisal bin Fahd Cup for Division 1 and 2 Teams
Winners (1): 2004-05
Runners-up (2): 1995–96, 2000–01
Prince Mohammad bin Salman League (Level 2)
Winners (4): 1987–88, 1997–98, 2010-11, 2013-14
Saudi Second Division (Level 3)
Winners (1): 2001-02

Current squad 
As of 7 September 2021: